Rimma Fyodorovna Kazakova (27 January 1932 – 19 May 2008) was a Soviet and Russian poet and translator. She was known for writing many popular songs of the Soviet era.

Biography
Kazakova was born in Sevastopol, Soviet Union. She graduated from the history department of Leningrad State University. She worked as a lecturer in Khabarovsk.

Her first rhymes were reminiscent of Yevtushenko, Okudzhava, Voznesensky and Rozhdestvensky and were first published in 1955. Her first poetry collection, Let's Meet in the East, was published in 1958.

From 1959 until her death, she was a member of the Union of Soviet Writers. She also held the position of First Secretary of the Moscow Union of Writers.

In October 1993, she signed the Letter of Forty-Two.

She died at age 76 at a medical sanatorium in Yudino village of Moscow Oblast, Russia on 19 May 2008. She was buried on 22 May 2008 at Vagankovo Cemetery in Moscow.

Notable works 
 There, Where You Are 
 Verses  
 Fridays  
 In Taiga Nobody Cries  
 Fir-trees Green  
 Snow Babe  
 I Remember 
 On White 
 Country named Love  
 Touchstone  
 Out of Mind  
 Plot of Hope

Honours and awards
Order "For Merit to the Fatherland", 4th class
Order of the Red Banner of Labour
Order of Friendship of Peoples
Medal "In Commemoration of the 850th Anniversary of Moscow"
Jubilee Medal "In Commemoration of the 100th Anniversary of the Birth of Vladimir Ilyich Lenin"
Medal "For Construction of the Baikal-Amur Railway"

See also 
 1977 in poetry
 List of Russian-language poets

References

External links 
 Rimma Kazakova at the rg.ru

1932 births
2008 deaths
20th-century Russian women writers
Writers from Sevastopol
Recipients of the Order "For Merit to the Fatherland", 4th class
Recipients of the Order of Friendship of Peoples
Recipients of the Order of the Red Banner of Labour
Russian-language poets
Russian educators
Russian women poets
Russian women singers
Russian women television presenters
Soviet educators
Soviet television presenters
Soviet women poets

Soviet women singers
Burials at Vagankovo Cemetery